Joseph Malaki Tomane (born 11 February 1990) is an Australian professional rugby union footballer. He played inside centre for Leinster in the first game of the 18/19 Pro14, and formerly played for the Brumbies in the Super Rugby competition. He has been capped for the Wallabies.

Early life

Tomane (pronounced Tor-mah-nee) is of Samoan and Cook Islander descent. He was born in Palmerston North, New Zealand but moved with his family to Brisbane, Australia when he was three years old.

In Brisbane, Tomane attended Marsden State High School and played rugby league alongside Israel Folau, Antonio Winterstein and Chris Sandow until he moved to Nudgee College for his senior year. At Nudgee, he played rugby union alongside James O'Connor. In 2007, Tomane played for the Australian Schoolboys, as did O'Connor.

Rugby league
In 2008, Tomane joined the Melbourne Storm in the National Rugby League. In only his ninth NRL game on 7 June 2009, playing against the Brisbane Broncos, Tomane scored three tries and took on the goal-kicking duties for the night to achieve six goals from nine attempts to bring his total points tally for the night to 24 in the Storm's 48–4 win over the Broncos.

Tomane signed with the Gold Coast Titans on a two-year deal starting from 2010. He was also selected in the Samoan training squad in 2010.

Rugby union
In June 2011 Tomane signed a two-year deal with the Brumbies to play in the Super Rugby competition.

Tomane made his International debut playing against Scotland at Hunter Stadium in Newcastle on 5 June 2012. He had limited opportunities in the wet conditions but made a try saving tackle. An ankle injury sustained during training two days later ruled him out of the subsequent test series against Wales.

On 5 July 2016, Tomane confirmed that he would be leaving the Brumbies for French club Montpellier at the end of the season.

On 12 June 2018 Leinster Rugby confirmed that they had signed Joe Tomane on a two year deal. His contract was not renewed for the 2020/2021 season and Leinster announced that he would be released on 13 July 2020.

On 1 October 2020, Tomane confirmed his move to Japan to join Ricoh Black Rams in the Top League competition from the 2020-21 season.

Personal life
In March 2014 Tomane was baptised along with twenty others at the Life Unlimited Church in Charnwood. Tomane was baptised as a child but wasn't religious growing up. However, after he turned his career around Tomane became a devout Christian. He now goes to church every week, prays before matches, has tattoos of his favourite bible verses, and pauses to thank God every time he scores a try. He also wants to start a Christian group for athletes in Canberra.

Tomane has nine tattoos, most in relation to his Christian faith or Samoan heritage. He also has three stars behind his ear, which are for daughter Starsha. His other favourite rite tattoos are the cross on his left hand and his favourite Bible verse written across his stomach – Philippians 4:13 "I can do all things through Him who gives me strength".

Super Rugby statistics

References

External links
ARU Profile
Brumbies Profile
Leinster Profile
Pro14 Profile

1990 births
Living people
Australian sportspeople of Samoan descent
Australian people of Cook Island descent
Australian people of New Zealand descent
Converts to Christianity
Australian Christians
Australian rugby union players
Australian rugby league players
ACT Brumbies players
Canberra Vikings players
Melbourne Storm players
Gold Coast Titans players
Australia international rugby union players
Ipswich Jets players
Rugby league centres
Rugby union players from Palmerston North
Rugby league wingers
Rugby league fullbacks
Rugby union wings
Rugby union centres
Rugby union players from Wellington City
Barbarian F.C. players
Montpellier Hérault Rugby players
Australian expatriate rugby union players
Expatriate rugby union players in Ireland
Australian expatriate sportspeople in Ireland
Sportspeople from Logan, Queensland
Leinster Rugby players
Black Rams Tokyo players
Biarritz Olympique players